Beaver Township is one of seventeen townships in Boone County, Iowa, USA.  As of the 2000 census, its population was 191.

History
Beaver Township was established in 1871. It is named for the Beaver Creek, along which many beavers were once trapped.

Geography

References

External links
 US-Counties.com
 City-Data.com

Townships in Boone County, Iowa
Townships in Iowa
1871 establishments in Iowa